Peter Green (January 1, 1891 – January 1961) was an American Negro league outfielder in the 1910s.

A native of Charleston, South Carolina, Green made his Negro leagues debut in 1912 with the Cuban Giants. He went on to play for the Philadelphia Giants and Lincoln Stars. Green died in 1961 at age 70.

References

External links
  and Seamheads

1891 births
1961 deaths
Cuban Giants players
Lincoln Stars (baseball) players
Philadelphia Giants players
Baseball outfielders
20th-century African-American sportspeople